Aleksandr Vladimirovich Ponomaryov (born 25 January 1986) is a former Russian professional footballer.

Club career
He made his debut in the Russian Premier League for FC Rostov in a game against FC Dynamo Moscow on 11 April 2009.

References

External links
 

Russian footballers
FC Dynamo Moscow reserves players
Russian expatriate footballers
Expatriate footballers in Ukraine
Russian expatriate sportspeople in Ukraine
FC Rostov players
FC Torpedo Moscow players
1986 births
Living people
Russian Premier League players
FC Chornomorets Odesa players
Ukrainian Premier League players
FC Vityaz Podolsk players
Association football defenders
FC Spartak Moscow players
FC Moscow players
Sportspeople from Volgograd Oblast